Bengal Orissa Bihar Baptist Convention is a Baptist Christian denomination in India. It operates in Odisha, Bihar and West Bengal, in the eastern part of India. The denomination has about 12,000 members, and approximately 70 congregations.

External links
Baptista World Alliance Statistics 1999

Christianity in Bihar
Christianity in Odisha
Baptist denominations in India
Christianity in West Bengal
Affiliated institutions of the National Council of Churches in India